Ma-Xu Weibang (1905–1961) was a Chinese film director active in mainland China from the 1920s to 1940s, and later in Hong Kong, perhaps best known for his work in the horror genre, the most important unarguably being The Phantom of the Opera-inspired, Song at Midnight. Ma-Xu was also known for a few acting roles early in his career, as well as for being a screenwriter. The director of 33 known films, much of Ma-Xu's early work has been lost.

Ma-Xu was born Xu Weibang in 1905 in Hangzhou, Zhejiang. Little is known of this early period except that his parents died while Ma-Xu was still a child, which was said to influence his decision to incorporate his wife's surname, "Ma".

Career in film
Ma-Xu studied at the Shanghai Institute of Fine Arts in the early 1920s. Following his graduation, he began working as an actor for the Mingxing Film Company, his first film being Zhang Shichuan's The Marriage Trap in 1924. Following a brief stint in the short-lived Langhua Film Company where he directed his first film in 1926, Ma-Xu returned to Mingxing where he began serving as assistant directors for some of the more established talent. His thriller, The Cry of Apes in a Deserted Valley is the only one of these directorial efforts to have survived.

Ma-Xu's first real success, however, did not come until 1937 with Song at Midnight, often referred to as China's first horror film. Based on Gaston Leroux's classic novel The Phantom of the Opera, the film is now seen as part of the canon of early Chinese cinema, and was also remade as The Phantom Lover by Ronny Yu in 1996. Ma-Xu followed up Song with two additional horror films, Walking Corpse in an Old House (1938) and The Lonely Soul (1938). In 1941, he made a lackluster sequel to Song at Midnight (during the height of the Second Sino-Japanese War), and also co-directed with Bu Wancang the controversial Japanese propaganda film Eternity (also known as The Opium War).

Like Bu, Ma-Xu suffered for his work on The Opium War after the Japanese were defeated and was eventually forced to move to Hong Kong where he continued to work in the film business until 1961, when he was killed in a road accident.

Filmography
Note: in most early Chinese films, there often were no official English translations, leading to a sometimes confusing lack of consistency in titles.

References

External links

Ma-Xu Weibang at the Chinese Movie Database

Film directors from Zhejiang
Male actors from Hangzhou
Screenwriters from Zhejiang
1905 births
1961 deaths
Artists from Hangzhou
Writers from Hangzhou
Male actors from Zhejiang
20th-century Chinese male actors
Chinese male film actors
Chinese film directors
Horror film directors
Chinese silent film directors
Chinese male silent film actors
20th-century screenwriters
Road incident deaths in Hong Kong